Denman is a surname, and may refer to:

A
Alex Denman, contemporary Canadian football player
Anthony Denman (born 1979), American football player

B
Brian Denman (born 1956), American baseball player

C
Charles Denman, 5th Baron Denman (1916–2012), British businessman
Chris Denman (born 1983), American football player

D
David Denman (born 1973), American film and television actor

E
Earl Denman, Canadian mountaineer who tried to climb Mount Everest in 1947

F
Frederick Denman (born 1929), American modern pentathlete

G
George Denman (1819–1896), English rower, barrister, politician and judge
George Denman (American football) (1874–1952), American teacher and football, basketball, and baseball coach
Gertrude Denman, Baroness Denman (1884–1954), British women's rights activist

H
Harry Denman (1893–1976), American evangelist
Helen Denman (born 1976), Australian swimmer
Herbert Denman (1855–1903), American figure-painter

J
J. J. Denman (born c.1994), American football player
Jeffry Denman, contemporary American actor, director, choreographer and author
John Leopold Denman (1882–1975), English architect
Joseph Denman (1810–1874), British naval officer notable for his actions against the slave trade

K
Kay Denman (born 1937), Australian politician

M
Mathias Denman (1760–1838), one of the founders of Cincinnati, Ohio

R
Sir Richard Denman, 1st Baronet (1876–1957), British politician

S
Stuart Denman (ice hockey) (born 1974), Australian ice hockey player

T
Thomas Denman (physician) (1733–1815), English expert in midwifery
Thomas Denman, 1st Baron Denman (1779–1854), British lawyer, judge and politician
Thomas Denman, 3rd Baron Denman (1874–1954), British politician, Governor-General of Australia
Tony Denman (born 1979), American actor
Trevor Denman (born 1952), South African American sportscaster and public-address announcer

U
Ulysses G. Denman (1866–1962), American politician

W
William Denman (judge) (1872–1959), Judge of the United States Court of Appeals for the Ninth Circuit
William Denman (publisher) (1784–1870), New York newspaperman

See also
 Denman (disambiguation)